This is a partial discography for Richard Strauss' opera Salome.

References 

Opera discographies
Operas by Richard Strauss